The Ibru Organization, established in 1956, became one of the largest conglomerates in Nigeria. By 1990 it had between 9,000 and 11,000 employees.
By 2009 the Ibru Organization was a multi-billion dollar business with interests that included shipping, agriculture, aviation, banking, oil and gas.

Origins

The Ibru family are Urhobo people from Agbarha-Otor, near Ughelli in Delta State.
The family patriarch was Chief Peter Epete Ibru, a missionary who worked for much of his life in Yorubaland.
His wife Janet Omotogor Ibru was the matriarch of Ibru dynasty, aged 98 years when she died on 15 March 2006.
She was a trader, and was closely involved in the organization.
The founder of the firm was their son Michael Ibru.
Michael gained a secondary education at Igbobi College, then worked for the United Africa Company from 1951 until 1956. That year, aged 24, he partnered with Jimmy Large, an Englishman, to form the Laibru general trading company, and also bought a share of Ace Jimonma, a construction firm.

Expansion

Starting in 1957, Ibru was a pioneer in distributing frozen fish in Nigeria. 
Although freshwater fishing was a major agricultural activity in Nigeria at the time, Ibru saw that this would change with economic development, opening a market for frozen fish.
At first he ran into technical problems with supply and also met consumer resistance. Two joint ventures both failed. He then formed Ibru Sea Foods as the sole owner, importing the frozen fish and at first trading from the back of a truck. He expanded quickly, chartering his first fishing boat in 1963, and in 1965 founding a fishing company with three freezer trawlers as a joint venture with a Japanese firm. Despite setbacks, the fishing fleet had grown to as many as 25 trawlers in the 1970s, and Ibru had 200 transport vehicles. Ibru had also expanded into vehicle distribution and fruit growing.

The organization continued to grow through acquisitions and joint ventures in diverse businesses including brewing, construction and petroleum distribution, with varying degrees of success. The company also acquired extensive holdings of real estate for agriculture and industrial activity. The recession of the early 1980s caused by falling oil prices, combined with import restrictions, forced contraction and a restructuring at the end of the 1980s. By this time, Michael's eldest son Olorogun Oskar Ibru had joined the boards of companies in the organization.

Companies
Rutam Motors was established in 1969, the firm took over management of Ibru's 200 fleet vehicle that were acquired from expatriate firms and were used to service the organizations various operations. The new firm acquired vehicle franchises and focused on after sales maintenance of vehicles from brands such as Mazda, British Leyland Peugeot and Jeep. The company also expanded into commercial tractor sales and maintenance.

Family members

The Ibru family was close, with all members involved in the business. Cecilia Ibru lead Oceanic Bank but she was arrested for a multi-billion dollar fraud. She went to jail and was given a fine of about one billion euros. Cecilia Ibru had started her career at this corporation.

Talking at Michael Ibru's 80th birthday celebration in January 2011, his eldest son Oskar said "The only thing I can say about my family is that we grew up as team. We were like a bunch of broom sticks".
Chief Michael Ibru helped his brothers with their education, gave them stakes in the Ibru organization and helped them to branch out on their own. Alex Ibru, chairman of Rutam Motors, met with newspapermen Stanley Mecebuh of the Daily Times of Nigeria, Dele Cole also formerly of that paper and Segun Osoba, formerly of the Nigerian Herald. With 55% funding from the Ibrus, they launched The Guardian in 1983, with Alex Ibru as chairman. 
Alex was minister of Internal Affairs from 1993 to 1995.
Goodie Ibru, who had qualified as a commercial lawyer, became president of the Nigerian Stock Exchange and chairman of Ikeja Hotels.
Felix Ibru studied architecture in Israel, and after teaching at Yaba College of Technology established an architectural firm, Entering politics, in 1992 Felix became governor of Delta State.

References

Sources

Conglomerate companies of Nigeria
Conglomerate companies established in 1956
1956 establishments in Nigeria